Stenodexia is a genus of parasitic flies in the family Tachinidae.

Species
Thryptodexia polita Malloch, 1926

Distribution
Philippines.

References

Endemic fauna of the Philippines
Diptera of Asia
Dexiinae
Tachinidae genera
Taxa named by John Russell Malloch
Monotypic Brachycera genera